GOST 7.79-2000 (Система стандартов по информации, библиотечному и издательскому делу. Правила транслитерации кирилловского письма латинским алфавитом) is a standard for transliteration from Cyrillic to Latin script for use on the internet, for speakers of languages that are normally written in Cyrillic script but who do not have access to a Cyrillic keyboard. It came into effect 2002-07-01. 

GOST 7.79-2000 contains two transliteration tables.

 System A one Cyrillic character to one Latin character, some with diacritics – identical to ISO 9:1995
 System B one Cyrillic character to one or many Latin characters without combining diacritics. Letters are distinguished with a spacing diacritic, which for online use is the ASCII grave accent (i.e., `) but when used on Moscow street signs may instead be the traditional prime (i.e.), depending on who printed the sign.

GOST 7.79 System B 

This standard (System B) appears to have been used in 2014 for the transliteration of street names on street signs in Moscow; its unusual appearance and non-intuitive sound values gave rise to criticism in the media.

National adoptions 
The verbatim translated text of ISO 9 is adopted as an inter-state standard in the countries listed below (the national designation is shown in parentheses). Other transcription schemes are also used in practice, though.

  (GOST 7.79)
  (GOST 7.79)
  (GOST 7.79)
  (GOST 7.79–2000, adopted 2003-03-01)
  (GOST 7.79)
  (GOST 7.79)
  (GOST 7.79)
  (GOST 7.79)
  (GOST 7.79)

See also
 Romanization of Russian
 Romanization of Ukrainian
 GOST standards
 GOST 16876-71

References

GOST standards
Romanization
Transliteration